Gordon Brian Burke (born February 5, 1941) was an American politician in the state of Iowa.

Burke attended high school in Marshalltown, Iowa and was a tool and die maker. He served in the Iowa House of Representatives from 1991 to 1995, as a Democrat.

References

1941 births
Politicians from Marshalltown, Iowa
Living people
Democratic Party members of the Iowa House of Representatives